If I Can't Have You may refer to:

"If I Can't Have You" (Bee Gees song), 1977, also recorded by Yvonne Elliman
"If I Can't Have You" (Kelly Clarkson song), 2009
"If I Can't Have You" (Shawn Mendes song), 2019
"If I Can't Have You", by Sara Bareilles from the album Amidst the Chaos, 2019
"If I Can't Have You", by Kylie and Garibay from the EP Kylie and Garibay, 2015
"If I Can't Have You", by Whitesnake from the album Flesh & Blood, 2019

See also
 "If I Ain't Got You", by Alicia Keys, 2009